The 1986 NAIA Division I football season was the 31st season of college football sponsored by the NAIA, was the 17th season of play of the NAIA's top division for football.

The season was played from August to November 1986 and culminated in the 1986 NAIA Champion Bowl, played this year on December 20, 1986 at Burke–Tarr Stadium in Jefferson City, Tennessee, on the campus of Carson–Newman College.

Carson–Newman defeated Cameron in the Champion Bowl, 17–0, to win their third NAIA national title.

Conference standings

Conference champions

Postseason

See also
 1986 NCAA Division I-A football season
 1986 NCAA Division I-AA football season
 1986 NCAA Division II football season
 1986 NCAA Division III football season

References

 
NAIA Football National Championship